Anthony Delpech (born 10 February 1969 in the Seychelles) is a thoroughbred horse racing jockey who competes internationally.

Delpech's family moved to Durban, South Africa when he was thirteen years old and it was there that he embarked on a career as a jockey. A three-time champion jockey  and the 1998, 2004, 2010 and 2011 winner of South Africa's premier race, the Durban July Handicap, he has ridden at the Champ de Mars Racecourse in Mauritius as well as the Singapore Racecourse in Kranji. However, in recent years he has met with considerable success at Sha Tin Racecourse in Hong Kong notably with Vengeance of Rain on whom he won the 2005 Hong Kong Cup and the 2007 Dubai Sheema Classic at Nad Al Sheba Racecourse. Anthony holds the record in South Africa for the most wins by a jockey in a season (334) which he set during the 1998/1999 racing season.

After a career-ending injury forced him to retire from the professional jockey ranks, Anthony has worked as a Brand Ambassador for Hollywoodbets.

Feature Race Wins

A list of Grade 1 wins by Anthony Delpech.

References
 Gold Circle article and photos on Anthony Delpech's win in the 2004 Durban July Handicap

1969 births
Living people
Seychellois jockeys
South African jockeys
Seychellois emigrants to South Africa